8 Leonis Minoris (8 LMi) is a solitary, red hued star located in the northern constellation Leo Minor. It has an apparent magnitude 5.37, making it faintly visible to the naked eye. Based on parallax measurements from the Gaia satellite, the object is estimated to be 492 light years distant. At its current distance, 8 LMi is diminshed by 0.12 magnitudes due to interstellar dust.

This is an asymptotic giant branch star with stellar classification of M1 IIIab. It has 1.59 times the mass of the Sun but has expanded to 48.5 times its girth.

8 LMi's variability was first observed to be variable in 1930 by Joel Stebbins. However, Eggen (1967) instead lists it as an ordinary M-type giant and used the object for comparison. In 1978-9, 8 LMi was again listed as a variable star but did not provide further insight.  As of 2017, the star has not been confirmed to be variable.

References

M-type giants
Suspected variables
Asymptotic-giant-branch stars
Leo Minor
Leonis Minoris, 8
BD+35 02015
082198
046735
3769